Philippe Hermann (1962, Arras) is a 20th–21st-century French writer, winner in 2000 of the Prix des Deux Magots and the Cino Del Duca scholarship with his novel .

1998: Technicien chair,
2000: La Vraie Joie,  Prix des Deux Magots
2001: Comment disparaître complètement,
2003: Souvenirs glorieux,
2016: La Patrie nocturne,

References

External links 
 www.philippe-hermann.fr Website
  Comment disparaître complètement on Le Matricule des anges
 Philippe Herman on Babelio

20th-century French novelists
21st-century French novelists
Prix des Deux Magots winners
People from Arras
1962 births
Living people
20th-century French male writers
21st-century French male writers